The Essex 73's are a Canadian junior ice hockey team based in Essex, Ontario.  The 73's are members of the Provincial Junior Hockey League and the Ontario Hockey Association.  Prior to becoming members of the PJHL in 2016 the 73's won the GLJHL playoff championship 20 times and the Clarence Schmalz Cup as Provincial Junior C Champions 7 times.

History
The Essex 73's have competed in the Great Lakes Junior C Hockey League since the 1973–74 season.  In total, the club has won 20 Great Lakes Junior C League Championships and 7 All-Ontario Junior C titles. By both measures, they are the most successful team in Great Lakes Junior C Hockey League history. Their 7 Clarence Schmalz Cup (CSC) wins and 14 CSC finals appearances are both Ontario Junior C records.

With Dave Prpich behind the bench, the 73's won four league titles in a row from 1974–1975 to 1977–1978, including three All-Ontario Championships in that span.  The 73's would claim two more Great Lakes League Championships in the 1980s in 1985–1986 and 1986–1987.

After some struggles in the early to mid-1990s, the 73's got back into winning form, taking the title for the first time in ten years. In 1997–1998 the team won the Great Lakes League Championship by defeating the Wallaceburg Lakers in the league final. Their loss to the Kincardine Bulldogs in the All-Ontario semifinals marked the 73's most successful season in a decade.

In the 2001–2002 season, general manager Al Lemay brought aboard head coach Tony Piroski, who coached the team from 2001 to 2010. The 73's had great success under Piroski, and in his first season the 73's won the Great Lakes League and the All-Ontario Title, defeating the Uxbridge Bruins in the finals.

On September 27, 2003, 19-year-old forward Glen Ivancic was fatally stabbed in Windsor. A banner #25 hung from the rafters at the Essex Memorial Arena for years before it was given to his parents.

The team reached the All-Ontario Junior C Finals five straight seasons (tying an Ontario Junior C Record), defeating the Grimsby Peach Kings in 2005 but losing to the Penetang Kings in 2006 and 2007. In 2008 they faced the offensive powerhouse Alliston Hornets and were defeated in a memorable game 7 overtime loss in Essex. The 2008–2009 season saw the 73's finish with a remarkable 59 wins, 1 overtime loss, 1 regulation loss, and 1 shoot-out loss (including play-offs). The team finished with 31 wins and 0 losses at home in their final season in the historic Essex Memorial Arena. The 73's returned to the finals in 2009 to face Alliston for the second straight year and the 73's fifth consecutive Clarence Schmalz Cup Finals appearance. Essex overwhelmed Alliston on their way to a four-game sweep to win the provincial title. In nine seasons under Piroski the 73's won 7 Great Lakes League Championships and claimed the Clarence Schmalz Cup 3 times as All-Ontario Champions.

The 73's re-hired Les Garrod to the team in the 2010–11 season; the team would finish 2nd place to the Belle River Canadiens and go out in the first round to the Wheatley Sharks in 7 games. It would be the first time in 15 years (1996–97) that the team did not make it out of the First round. Garrod and staff would not be back the following year.

The 73's brought aboard former Windsor Spitfire Scott Miller for the 2011 season as the club's general manager and hired former Lasalle Vipers assistant Gil Langois as head coach. This tandem delivered four consecutive Great Lakes League Championships and three Clarence Schmalz Cup Finals appearances, including one OHA Junior C Championship. In 2013 the 73's swept both Ayr and the familiar Niagara champion Grimsby before losing in the CSC finals 4 games to 1 to the Picton Pirates. 2014 featured a more difficult road to the CSC finals with a high-scoring 7-game quarterfinal against Dorchester along with a 5-game semifinal victory over the Western League champion Wingham Ironmen before the 73's were swept in the Schmalz Cup finals by the Lakefield Chiefs. In 2015 the 73's defeated Exeter in four games and Ayr in five qualifying for their third straight CSC appearance. In three closely contested games versus the Empire B champion Port Hope Panthers, the 73's built up a 3–0 series lead, but the Panthers stormed back, winning the next three games, setting up a winner-take-all game 7 in Port Hope. A lone second-period goal was the difference between the teams as the 73's clinched their seventh CSC All-Ontario Championship and first since 2009.

In the summer of 2016 the eight junior "C" leagues amalgamated under the Provincial, and the GLJHL became the Bill Stobbs Division of the new league. During the 2016–17 season, the 73's won their first Stobbs Division title but fell to the Ayr Centennials in the PJHL semi-final.

In 2017–2018, the Essex 73's streak of 6 straight League Championships came to an end as the Lakeshore Canadiens defeated the 73's in 5 games in the Stobbs Division Finals. The Canadiens were coached by former 73's player and coach Anthony Iaquinta.

2018-2019 saw Gil Langlois return as Head Coach of the 73's and guided the 73's to a First Place finish.  The 73's would sweep their first 2 rounds against the Petrolia Flyers and Amherstburg Admirals setting up a rematch against the Lakeshore Canadiens in the division Finals.  The Canadiens would repeat as Stobbs Champions knocking off the 73's in 5 games.

In 2019 Gil Langlois retired, and was replaced as coach by former Sarnia Sting player Danny Anger.

Season-by-season results

Clarence Schmalz Cup appearances
1975: Essex 73's defeated Lindsay Muskies 4-games-to-3
1976: Dunnville Terriers defeated Essex 73's 4-games-to-2
1977: Essex 73's defeated Bowmanville Eagles 4-games-to-2
1978: Essex 73's defeated Bowmanville Eagles 4-games-to-1
1981: Bowmanville Eagles defeated Essex 73's 4-games-to-2
2002: Essex 73's defeated Uxbridge Bruins 4-games-to-3
2005: Essex 73's defeated Grimsby Peach Kings 4-games-to-3
2006: Penetang Kings defeated Essex 73's 4-games-to-1
2007: Penetang Kings defeated Essex 73's 4-games-to-1
2008: Alliston Hornets defeated Essex 73's 4-games-to-3
2009: Essex 73's defeated Alliston Hornets 4-games-to-none
2013: Picton Pirates defeated Essex 73's 4-games-to-1
2014: Lakefield Chiefs defeated Essex 73's 4-games-to-none
2015: Essex 73's defeated Port Hope Panthers 4-games-to-3

General managers
List of general managers:

 1973–1974 - Herb Rounding
 1974–1983 - Mike Sadler
 1983–1987 - Mickey McDermott
 1987–1988 - Mike Quinlan
 1988–1989 - Don Leonard
 1989–1990 - Dan Mills
 1990–1991 - Mike Klyn
 1991–1993 - Don McDermott
 1993–1994 - Tom Mailloux
 1994–1995 - Glen O'Neil
 1995–1997 - Les Garrod
 1997–2002 - Al Lemay
 2002–2003 - Jim Rauth
 2003–2005 - Al Lemay
 2005–2010 - Mark Barnett
 2010–2011 - Les Garrod
 2011–2017 - Scott Miller
 2017–2018 - Cam Crowder / Steve Caldwell
 2018–2020 - Steve Cardwell
 2020–2021 - Mike Pailey

Coaches
List of coaches:

 1973–1974 - Jim Peck
 1974–1979 - Dave Prpich
 1979–1980 - Dave Moore
 1980–1982 - Dave Prpich
 1982–1984 - Bill Bellaire
 1984–1987 - Mike Quinlan
 1987–1989 - Dan Mills
 1989–1990 - Lee Jones
 1990–1991 - Mike Klym
 1991–1993 - Don McDermott
 1993–1994 - Rod Isbister
 1994–1995 - Glen O'Neil
 1995–1998 - Les Garrod
 1998–1999 - Mike Gomes
 1999–2001 - Les Garrod
 2001–2010 - Tony Piroski
 2010–2011 - Glen Holden
 2011–2016 - Gil Langlois
 2016–2018 - Cam Crowder
 2018–2019 - Gil Langlois
 2019–2022 - Danny Anger

Notable alumni
 Bruce Crowder
 Keith Crowder
 Dave Gagnon
 Warren Rychel
 Colton Fretter
 Dan O'Halloran

References
 Team statistics

External links
 

1973 establishments in Ontario
Essex, Ontario
Great Lakes Junior C Hockey League teams
Ice hockey clubs established in 1973